This is a list of Canadian films which were released in the 1960s.

References

1960s
Canada